Samuel Lawrence Dailey (March 31, 1904 – December 2, 1979) was a pitcher in Major League Baseball. Dailey pitched for the Philadelphia Phillies in 1929, with 20 appearances, including four starts.

References

External links

1904 births
1979 deaths
Major League Baseball pitchers
Philadelphia Phillies players
Baseball players from Illinois